Intrahealth Systems Limited is a privately held company that develops, licences, supports and sells electronic health record software, medical practice management software, and related services. Founded in Auckland, New Zealand by Dr. Mark Matthews and Dr. Andrew Hall in 1997, they have since moved their headquarters to the City of North Vancouver, British Columbia, Canada in 2005. Apart from the head office, Intrahealth maintains offices in Auckland, New Zealand; Sydney; and Toronto, Canada.

History
Intrahealth was founded in 1997 and spent its early years developing Profile and moving towards becoming one of New Zealand's largest vendors of Practice Management Systems (PMS).

The ACT (Australian Capital Territory) Division of General Practice entered into an alliance with Intrahealth to supply clinical and patient management software for general practitioners in Canberra and surrounding areas in 2003.

In 2005, Intrahealth expanded into British Columbia, Canada after winning a significant contract with Fraser Health Authority. The expansion saw additional contracts awarded from Vancouver Coastal, Interior, and Intertribal Health Authorities between that year and 2006. Also, in its home country, Intrahealth won a contract with the New Zealand Defense Force which would see its software used for the medical records of the defence force's 10,000 employees.

Profile for iOS was announced as a portable version of its practice management system in 2012, combining both a live online mode with syncing for offline use.

In 2013, Intrahealth was selected as the sole approved EHR provider for New Brunswick's provincial program. The selection followed a rigorous procurement process conducted by Velante, a subsidiary of the New Brunswick Medical Society, in which 16 other vendors submitted proposals. Additionally, Profile was granted dual National Class certification as both an Electronic Medical Record (EMR) and Ambulatory EMR by Canada Health Infoway, the first company to do so.

Products
 Profile (Medical practice management software and Electronic health record system for Windows)
 Profile for Mac (Medical practice management software and Electronic health record system for OS X)
 Aero (Patient and Provider app platform for iOS and Android)
 Accession (Patient web portal)
 Maestro (Electronic messaging platform)
 Insync 
 com.unity

See also
 Medical practice management software
 Electronic health record
 Health information technology

References

External links
 

Software companies of New Zealand
Software companies of Canada
Software companies established in 1997
Companies based in North Vancouver
Electronic health record software companies
New Zealand companies established in 1997
Canadian companies established in 1997